Benjamin Jiménez Hernández (31 March 1938 – 26 November 2020) was a Mexican Roman Catholic bishop.

Jiménez Hernández was born in Mexico and was ordained to the priesthood in 1963. He served as titular bishop of Sellectum and as auxiliary bishop of the Roman Catholic Diocese of Culiacán, Mexico from 1989 to 1993 and then as bishop of the diocese from 1993 to 2011.

Notes

1936 births
2020 deaths
20th-century Roman Catholic bishops in Mexico
21st-century Roman Catholic bishops in Mexico